The Willys MB and the Ford GPW, formally the U.S. Army Truck, -ton, 4×4, Command Reconnaissance, informally the Willys Jeep, Jeep, or jeep, and sometimes referred to by its supply catalogue designation G503, are American off-road four-wheel drive military light utility vehicles, built in large numbers to a single standardized design, for the United States and the Allies of World War II from 1941 until 1945.

The U.S. Army had been requesting a small, light four-wheel drive vehicle since the early 1920s, to replace the motorcycles, older vehicles, and animals used as transportation during World War I. Though early concepts were prototyped in the 1930s, the jeep's actual design and development occurred shortly before American entry into World War II. The jeep became the workhorse of the U.S. military during the war, replacing horses and draft animals in almost every role from cavalry to logistics, while improvised field modifications made the jeep capable of performing practically any other function necessary. An amphibious variant of the jeep, the Ford GPA, was also produced, but its flaws compared to other Allied amphibious vehicles led to its quick discontinuation.

With almost 650,000 units built, the jeep constituted a quarter of the total U.S. non-combat motor vehicles produced during the war, or almost two-thirds of the 988,000 light 4WD vehicles produced, when counted together with the Dodge WC series. The jeep massively outproduced its primary Axis counterpart, Nazi Germany's Volkswagen Kübelwagen, which only had a production total of 50,000 units. Large numbers of jeeps were provided to U.S. allies through Lend-Lease.

The jeep was widely revered for its reliability and wide usage. General Dwight D. Eisenhower wrote in his memoirs that most senior officers regarded it as one of the five pieces of equipment most vital to American victory in Africa and Europe. Army Chief of Staff General George C. Marshall called the jeep "America's greatest contribution to modern warfare." Historian Charles K. Hyde wrote: "In many respects, the jeep became the iconic vehicle of World War II, with an almost mythological reputation of toughness, durability, and versatility." In 1991, the Willys MB was designated an International Historic Mechanical Engineering Landmark by the American Society of Mechanical Engineers, and in 2010, the American Enterprise Institute deemed the jeep "one of the most influential designs in automotive history".

After World War II, the U.S. military continued to use the jeep in the Korean War and other conflicts, until it was gradually phased out by updated models—the 1949 Willys MC and the 1952 Willys MD—and received a complete redesign by Ford in the form of the 1960 M151 jeep. Use of the original jeep continued in other countries worldwide long after the war and American replacement, and its general appearance and configuration were mimicked for numerous similar vehicles, making it one of the most recognizable and widely used military vehicles in history. The jeep's popularity led to the release of the Jeep , the world's first mass-produced civilian four-wheel drive, in 1945. The "Jeep" name was soon trademarked and grew into a successful and highly valued brand, currently owned by Stellantis .

History

The design challenge and achievement 

The idea of the jeep originated with infantry requests for a low-profile, powerful vehicle with four-wheel drive. The idea was turned over to commercial companies (chiefly American Bantam, Willys, and Ford) to deliver – the development repeatedly being described as a "design by committee". In fall 1941, Lt. E.P. Hogan of the U.S. Army Quartermaster Corps wrote: "Credit for the original design of the Army's truck -ton, 4x4, may not be claimed by any single individual or manufacturer. This vehicle is the result of much research and many tests." Hogan credited both military and civilian engineers, especially those working at the Holabird Quartermaster Depot. Nevertheless, in a case of the U.S. Federal Trade Commission (FTC), charging Willys-Overland with misrepresentation in their advertising and news claims, ruled that, according to the New York Times, Willys did not perform the "spectacular achievement" of creating, designing and perfecting the jeep together with U.S. Army Quartermaster officers, but that: "The idea of creating a "jeep" was said by the FTC .. to have been originated by the American Bantam [Co.] of Butler, PA "[with U.S. Army officers]" and to have been [conceived and] developed by that company."

Officially, on 7 April 1942, U.S. patent 2278450 for the final design of the jeep, titled "Military vehicle body", was awarded to the U.S. Army, which had applied for it, listing Colonel Byron Q. Jones as the inventor on the patent, though he had performed no work on the design of the vehicle. Filed on 8 October 1941, stating in the application that "The invention described herein, if patented, may be manufactured and used by or for the Government for governmental purposes without the payment of any royalty thereon", the patent relates to a "small car vehicle body having convertible features whereby it is rendered particularly desirable for military purposes" and describes the purpose as being "a convertible small car body so arranged that a single vehicle may be interchangeably used as a cargo truck, personnel carrier, emergency ambulance, field beds, radio car, trench mortar unit, mobile anti-aircraft machine gun unit, or for other purposes."

First motorizations and World War I
For centuries, horses were used for reconnaissance, communications, and pulling loads, whenever wars were fought, but after the start of the 20th century, motorcycles were the first motor vehicles eagerly adopted by the military, either to replace mounted/ridden cavalry horses, or to motorize infantry.

The armies of World War I relied on marching men, horses, and railways for movement, but its new technologies introduced motor vehicles: the first tanks, armored car, and artillery tractors. Motorcycles were the most prolific motor-tools in the Allied arsenal.

Cavalry, mounted infantry, scouts and messengers could now be mobilized in combat with much greater speed, agility, and near tireless machines, exactly what was wanted for relaying critical orders, getting munitions to machine guns, and scouting miles ahead of advancing units. The quick and nimble motorcycle, "ridden hard through shot and shell to secure victory", has made itself irreplaceable in specific roles on the battlefield to this day.

But motorcycles also had serious limitations. One could be fast on a decent road, but many roads were still so bad, that the U.S. already had a Good Roads Movement in the late 19th century, as increased usage of bicycles required improving the surfaces of the existing wagon and carriage trails. The motorcycles of the era were not ideal; only the best motorcyclists could endure a muddy battlefield trail, control the bike and keep it from stalling, damage, or flipping over; and driver training was both costly in terms of time and money. They had poor off-roading ability and lacked payload capacity. Adding a sidecar provided more stability, but payload and cargo space remained very limited, and having only one powered wheel out of three, still meant the combination got stuck a lot. Both British and American 3x2 WWI motorized tricycles, with two driven rear wheels, were devised Royal Page Davidson used patents of Charles Duryea to modify chassis, with machine-guns and armor shield, from 1898.At the same time, the arrival and growing use of automobiles led to various individuals pioneering cross-USA vehicle trips, followed by the first transcontinental trips by convoys of vehicles. After the U.S. Army purchased its first truck in 1907, of 5-ton payload capacity, in the late summer of 1913, the Army Medical and Quartermaster Corps (QC) took a 3/4-ton QC field-truck, on a  multi-leg experimental trek through Alaska for the state's Road Commission – both to try the truck's bad-road supply and maintenance abilities as well as test the state of several important overland connections in the rough territory. In 1915 followed the first successful transcontinental motor convoy, traveling the entire Lincoln Highway from New York City to the Panama-Pacific World Exhibition in San Francisco, taking four months.
Starting 1916, the Quartermaster Corps was servicing over 100 'motor trucks', of as many as 27 'varieties'; and in March of that year, the U.S. Army decided to form its first two motor companies, to be used immediately in the Pancho Villa Expedition in Mexico, starting 14 March 1916. One company got 27 four-wheel drive, 2ton, Jeffery off-road Quad trucks. The other got 27 heavy-duty, 1ton, long wheelbase, rear-wheel drive White trucks. The U.S. War Department procured the vehicles as rolling chassis, which the manufacturers had to expedite to El Paso, Texas. The wagon bodies for the chassis came from the Quartermaster Depot. The most suitable truck capacity found by the Quartermaster General for Army use to be 1ton, matching both the country roads nature, the strength of bridges, as well as the existing troop supply system, at the time also using standard 1ton, four-mule wagons.

Meanwhile, World War I had been raging in Europe since 1914. More than five years before, Henry Ford had launched his Model T. "Its speed, durability, stamina, and ease of maintenance (compared to a horse) had already won over many civilians," and British and French forces also wanted them. Ford, an isolationist, would not sign a contract with an overseas government, but local dealers sold over 50,000 Fords to European forces, who militarized them locally, most famously into ambulances. When the U.S. entered the war in 1917, Ford sold directly to his country, delivering another 15,000 cars before the end of the war.

Britain, France, and Russia were already buying American-made four-wheel drive trucks from the Four Wheel Drive Auto Company, and Jeffery/Nash Quads, due to their ability to handle the muddy roads of European battlefields.

The United States procured thousands of motor vehicles for its military, including some 12,800 Dodges, plus thousands of four-wheel drive trucks: 1ton Nash Quads, and 3 and 5ton FWD trucks. General John J. Pershing viewed horses and mules as acceptable for the previous three U.S. wars, but in the new century, his cavalry forces had to move quicker, with more range and more personnel. He was the first to deploy motorcycles in the Mexican Border War, predominantly a cavalry campaign over wide regions of the Southwest, where Harley-Davidson motorcycles provided to the Army gave the U.S. the advantage over the horse-mounted Mexicans. The U.S. Army was so pleased with further innovations, such as a sidecar as a platform to mount machine-guns, that the U.S. procured many more motorcycles than 4WD trucks for World War I. "Entire infantry units were mobilized on motorcycles, and they also provided an ideal way to rapidly deploy machine gun crews into position. Medical units used them to evacuate wounded on stretcher-equipped sidecars, and to return medical supplies and ammunition"

"By the end of the war, the whole world saw the horse as hopelessly outclassed."

Interbellum tests, and formulating the need for a standardized, 4x4, quarter-ton

Immediately after World War I, the future use of motor vehicles was considered. In 1919, the U.S. Army Quartermaster Corps recommended the acquisition of a new kind of military vehicle, "..of light weight and compact size, with a low silhouette and high ground clearance, and possess the ability to carry weapons and men over all sorts of rough terrain."  The U.S. Army started looking for a small vehicle suited for reconnaissance and messaging, while at the same time searching for a light cross-country weapons carrier.
However, after World War I, U.S. military budgets were drastically cut, and so any development of a light 4WD car was curtailed until the late 1930s.

At the same time, there was a drive for standardization. By the end of World War I, U.S. forces overseas had a total of 216 different makes and models of motor vehicles to operate, both foreign and domestic, and no good supply system to keep them running.

Various light motor vehicles were tested — at first motorcycles with and without sidecars, and some modified Ford Model Ts. But what was needed was a very light, small, battlefield utility vehicle to replace motorcycles (with or without sidecar) — more user-friendly to control, but just as easy to get in and out of. In the early 1930s, the U.S. Army experimented with a bantam weight "midget truck" for scouts and raiders. A , low-slung mini car with a pick-up body, provided by American Austin Car Company, was shown in a 1933 article in Popular Mechanics magazine. One of the pictures showed that the vehicle was light enough to be man-handled — four soldiers could lift it from the ground entirely. But it was still only rear-wheel drive.

After 1935, when the U.S. Congress declared World War I vehicles obsolete, procurement for "remotorization of the Army" gained more traction, but pre-war, peacetime budget restrictions meant that the U.S. Comptroller General imposed open bidding on every additional/incremental procurement. Each time, the Army was forced to award the contract to the lowest bid that met requirements or specifications, often different makers – however, saving a small percentage initially, on the procurement, overall proved "penny wise, pound foolish" because it led to problematic diversity of the fleet, requiring too much training of operators and mechanics for maintenance and repairs, and too many non-interchangeable spare parts – bad for war logistics, and preventing the repair of one vehicle by scavenging parts off another. And the Army could still only get multi-axle drive on trucks, "requiring the greatest battlefield mobility".

Meanwhile, in Asia and the Pacific, Japan had invaded Manchuria in 1931, and was at war with China from 1937. Its Imperial Army used a small, three-man crew, four-wheel drive car for reconnaissance and troop movements, the Kurogane Type 95, produced in limited numbers from 1936.

In 1937 Marmon-Herrington presented five 4x4 Fords, and American Bantam (previously American Austin) once again contributed — delivering three Austin derived roadsters in 1938. The U.S. Army itself had also built an experimental light, low-profile scout and gun mover, the Howie-Wiley Machine Gun Carrier, ordered by General Walter Short, then Assistant Commander of the Army's Infantry School at Fort Benning, Georgia, and built by Captain Robert G. Howie and Master Sergeant Melvin C. Wiley. Completed in April 1937, with a driver and a gunner laying prone, operating a .30 caliber machine gun, the vehicle was nicknamed the "belly flopper".

The Quartermaster Corps saw that the Army needed truck chassis to be standardized in crucial basic functional 'types' (body models), and within 'payload capacity' classes. Additionally, some crucial features could not be equipped by the QC to commercial trucks after procurement. Cross-country capabilities, like increased ground clearance and multi-axle drive, had to be designed and built into the trucks from the factory. The Quartermaster Corps Technical Committee concurred, and in June 1939 requested the Chief of Staff's approval, to start standardizing truck chassis and bodies procured for the Army into five payload classes: ton, 1ton, 2ton, 4ton, and 7-ton and all tactical trucks had to have (part-time) all-wheel drive capability. Furthermore, to achieve the needed level of standardization, the Quartermaster General urged trucks should be bought en masse from there on. Acting Chief of Staff, George C. Marshall, approved the procurement policy in the summer of 1939. The Quartermaster Corps also wanted to require the truck industry to use dimensionally interchangeable components, but further standardization measures were not approved until 1940.

However, in 1940 the categories were revised. For the first time, a quarter-ton truck chassis class was introduced, at the bottom of the range, and the -ton category was supplanted by a -ton chassis.

By the eve of entering World War II, the United States Department of War had determined it needed a -ton, cross-country reconnaissance vehicle. Although -ton four-by-fours had outperformed -ton 4x4 trucks during testing in 1938, the half-ton 4x4 trucks – both from Marmon-Herrington Ford, and the 1940 Dodge VC series – still proved too large and heavy, and insufficiently agile off-road. Anxious to have a quarter-ton truck in time for America's entry into World War II, the U.S. Army solicited proposals from domestic automobile manufacturers. Recognizing the need to create standard specifications, the Army formalized its requirements on 11 July 1940, and submitted them to 135 U.S. automotive manufacturers.

Development start – Bantam Reconnaissance Car

In the early 1930s, the Infantry Board at Fort Benning had become interested in the British Army's use of the tiny Austin 7 car in a reconnaissance role, and in 1933 obtained a car from the American Austin Car Company in Pennsylvania which built them under license. Meanwhile, American Austin had gone bankrupt, and its assets were purchased by a new company which became American Bantam. In 1938, American Bantam loaned three much-improved cars to the Pennsylvania National Guard for trials during summer maneuvers, which were received as reliable, economical and practical. American Bantam officials met with chiefs of Infantry and Cavalry and suggested a contract to further develop a military version of their car. But a subcommittee of army officers and civilian engineers was tasked to determine exact specifications for the proposed vehicles, including the now major Robert Howie. One of their first actions was to visit the American Bantam factory, to evaluate their compact cars and production facilities. Once there, Howie stayed several days, and by the end of June 1940, with American Bantam's consultation, the initial specifications were drawn up. Its body design was to be rectangular, including a sketch drawing, handed to the Ordnance Technical Committee.

By now the war was underway in Europe, so the Army's need was urgent and demanding. Bids were to be received by 22 July, a span of just eleven days. Manufacturers were given 49 days to submit their first prototype and 75 days for the completion of 70 test vehicles. The diminutive dimensions were similar in size and weight to the American Bantam's compact truck and roadster models.

Initially, only American Bantam Car Company and Willys-Overland entered the competition. Ford joined later. Although Willys was the low bidder, Willys was penalized for requesting more time, and American Bantam received the contract, as the only company committing to deliver a pilot model in 49 days and production examples .

American Bantam's chief engineer, Harold Crist, who had previously worked on the first Duesenberg and been an engineer at Stutz Motor Company of Indianapolis for 18 years, drafted freelance Detroit designer Karl Probst to collaborate. Probst turned down American Bantam initially, but agreed to work without pay after an Army request and began work on 17 July 1940.

Karl Probst laid out full design drawings for the American Bantam prototype, known as the Bantam Reconnaissance Car, or BRC Pilot, in just two days, and worked up a cost estimate the next day. American Bantam's bid was submitted, complete with blueprints, on 22 July. American Bantam had purchased the assets of American Austin Car Company from the bankruptcy court and had developed their own line of small cars and engine technology, free of licenses from the British Austin Motor Company. As the only small car manufacturer in the United States at the time, their design was able to leverage commercial off-the-shelf components as much as possible. American Bantam adapted front sheet metal body stampings from its car line: the cowl, dashboard, and curvy front fenders. Custom four-wheel drive-train components included the Spicer transfer case to send power to front and back axles, plus the axles were Spicer units for the Studebaker Champion, modified for four-wheel drive use.

Using off-the-shelf automotive parts where possible had partly enabled drawing up the blueprints quickly. By working backward, Probst and American Bantam's draftsmen converted what Crist and a few others had put together into drawings. The hand-built prototype was then completed in Butler, Pennsylvania, and driven to the Army vehicle test center at Camp Holabird, Maryland. It was delivered on 23 September 1940. The vehicle met all the Army's criteria except vehicle weight and engine torque. The American Bantam Pilot, initially called the "Blitz Buggy", and later also dubbed "Old Number One") presented Army officials with the first of what eventually evolved into the World War II U.S. military jeep.

Willys and Ford – early production jeeps

As American Bantam did not have the production capacity or financial resources to deliver on the scale needed by the War Department, the other two bidders, Ford and Willys, were encouraged to complete their own pilot models for testing. The contract for the new reconnaissance car was to be determined by trials. While American Bantam's prototype underwent testing at Camp Holabird from 27 September to 16 October, Ford and Willys technical representatives were invited and given ample opportunity to observe the vehicle and study its performance. To expedite Ford and Willys' production, the War Department forwarded the American Bantam blueprints to them, claiming the government owned all designs in the proposals submitted to it in the bidding contest. American Bantam chose not to dispute this.

The Willys "Quad" and the Ford "Pygmy" prototype models were similar to the American Bantam Pilot and were joined in testing by American Bantam's BRC-60. By then the U.S. armed forces were in such haste, and allies like Britain, France, and USSR were trying to acquire these new "Blitz-Buggies", that all three cars were declared acceptable and orders for 1,500 units per company were given for field testing and export. On 22 January 1941, the Quartermaster Corps Technical Committee advised standardization of the jeeps across all manufacturers.

For early production runs, each vehicle received revisions and a new name. American Bantam's became the  Production began on 31 March 1941, with a total of 2,605 built up to 6 December — the number ordered was raised because Britain and the USSR already wanted more of them supplied under Lend-Lease.

The American Bantam BRC-40 was the lightest and most nimble of the three early production models, and the Army lauded its good suspension, brakes, and high fuel economy. However, as the company could not meet the Army's demand for 75 vehicles a day, production contracts were also awarded to Willys and Ford.

The Ford GP was not only the most numerous (about 4,458) early production jeeps — it was also the first jeep fielded in some numbers to U.S. Army units. Ford's overall design and quality of construction had advantages over the American Bantam and Willys models, but the GP's engine, an adaptation of their Model N tractor engine, was underpowered and not sufficiently reliable. Ford built fifty units with four-wheel steering, of which four have survived.

After many painstaking detail changes, Willys renamed their vehicle "MA", for "Military" model "A". Only 1,555 MAs were built, most of which went to the Soviet Union under Lend-Lease. Only 27 units are still known to exist.

Eventually, virtually all of the Willys-Overland and most of the American Bantam and Ford GP early production jeeps were provided to Britain and USSR, leaving a few hundred American Bantam BRCs and under 1,000 GPs for the home troops.

Full production – Willys MB and Ford GPW

By July 1941, the War Department desired to standardize and decided to select a single manufacturer to supply them with the next order of 16,000 vehicles. Willys won the contract mostly due to its much more powerful 60 hp engine (the L134 "Go Devil"), which soldiers raved about, and its lower cost and silhouette. The design features in the Bantam and Ford entries which represented an improvement over Willys's design were incorporated into the Willys, moving it from an "MA" designation to "MB". Most obvious is the front design from the Ford GP, with a wide, flat hood, and the headlights moved inward from the fenders to under the hood, protected by a single wide, straight front grille and a brush guard.

The jeep, once it entered mass production, introduced several new automotive technologies. Having four-wheel drive for the first time introduced the need for a transfer case, and the use of constant-velocity joints on the driven front wheels and axle, to a regular production car-sized vehicle.

In early October 1941, it became clear that Willys-Overland could not keep up with procurement needs, and Ford received government contracts to build 30,000 units, according to Willys' blueprints, drawings, specifications, and patents, including the more powerful Willys engine. When Ford offered to increase the displacement and power of the tractor engine in their GP model, the government declined and insisted that Ford produce jeeps identical to the Willys, both for the much stronger engine, and for complete commonality/interchangeability of the components. Willys received no license fees, and Ford complied. The Ford was designated "GPW", with the "W" indicating the "Willys" licensed design and engine. Ford retooled at a cost of $4 million to build Willys engines and produced the first GPW as quickly as 2 January 1942. Just days before, in late December 1941, the Quartermaster Corps had ordered another 63,146 GPWs. 

One extra condition to Ford's jeep orders was to manufacture them in several different Ford assembly plants, in addition to Ford's primary 'River Rouge' plant in Dearborn (Michigan). The QC expressly demanded Ford decentralize their jeep manufacturing to facilitate the Army's logistics, shipping from all three coasts. Besides Dearborn, Ford also assembled jeeps in their Louisville, Chester (Pennsylvania), Dallas (Texas), and Richmond (California) plants. Ford's Edgewater (New Jersey) plant also built jeeps in the first four months of 1943. 

During World War II, Willys produced 363,000 Jeeps and Ford some 280,000. Some 50,000 were exported to the USSR under the Lend-Lease program. Ford's assembly across plants distributed as: River Rouge 21,559; Dallas and Louisville almost tied at 93,748 and 93,364 units respectively; Chester 18,533, and Edgewater just 1,333 units. Bantam stopped further jeep production and made two-wheel jeep trailers. This was sufficient to keep the firm going until it was taken over in 1956.

Ford built jeeps with functionally interchangeable parts and components, in part facilitated by using components from common sources: frames from Midland Steel, wheels from Kelsey-Hayes, and axles and transfer cases from Spicer. However, Ford had replaced the welded grate front grille by a single pressed/stamped sheet steel part, with nine vertical open slots to ventilate the radiator, and circular openings in front of the lights, to simplify production, and save costs. Willys also adopted this in their production of the MB after unit 25,808. Predictably, there were still many minor differences; the Ford chassis had an inverted U-shaped front cross member instead of a tubular bar, and a Ford script letter "F" was stamped onto many small parts.

Many body detail differences remained for as long as January 1944, when a composite body, fabricated by American Central, was finally agreed upon by both Ford and Willys. American Central had been making the jeep's bodies from the first 1500 units order for the Willys MA and had also built Ford's jeep bodies for two years already, but until January 1944, Ford and Willys contracts retained detail differences. However, from then on features of both designs were integrated. Through the chaotic circumstances of war, sometimes peculiar deviations from regular mass-production came off the assembly line, that are now prized by collectors. For instance: the earliest Ford GPWs had a Willys design frame, and in late-1943, some GPWs came with an unmodified Willys body; and in 1945 Willys produced some MBs with a deep mud exhaust system, vacuum windshield wipers, and a Jeep CJstyle parking brake.

Ford GPA "Sea Jeep""
Approximately 13,000 additional amphibious jeeps were built by Ford as the Ford GPA (nicknamed "Seep" for "Sea Jeep"). Inspired by the larger DUKW, the vehicle was produced too quickly and proved to be too heavy, too unwieldy, and with insufficient freeboard. In spite of participating with some success in the Sicily landings in July 1943, many were passed on under the Lend-Lease program; some 3,500 to the USSR alone. The Soviets were sufficiently pleased with its ability to cross the many rivers and swamps in their territories, to develop their own version of it after the war, the GAZ-46.

Accessories and equipment fittings

Unlike the various Dodge WC series models of larger, light 4x4 trucks, the Willys and Ford jeeps were all the same from the factory, and specialization happened only through standardized accessories, field kits, and local / in-field modifications. Frequently made additions to the standard jeeps were to fit weaponry, communications equipment, Litter carriers, wire cutters, or rudimentary armor.

Jeep trailer
Some 150,000 -ton trailers were made by over ten different companies, specifically built to be towed by the jeep – most of them by Bantam and Willys. These doubled the jeeps' nominal payload. Their designs were hardly changed after the war, and versions of them remained in use for ton jeeps, into the 1990s.

Radio gear

The jeep's primary command and reconnaissance roles of course necessitated fitting many kinds of tactical communication equipment. The first standard production fitting was for the SCR-193 radio, placed on either side in the rear of a jeep, on top of the rear wheel well. For proper reception, this included radio interference suppression shielding, so indicated by a suffix 'S' on the jeep's hood registration number. In 1943/1944, the Army shifted to FM radios, and new fittings were developed for those. At least fourteen Signal Corps Radio set fittings were standardized, including for the SCR-187, SCR-284, SCR-499, SCR-506, SCR-508, SCR-510, SCR-522, SCR-528, SCR-542, SCR-608, SCR-610, SCR-619, SCR-628, SCR-694, SCR-808, SCR-828, and VRC-l.

Gun mounts

Two of the original uses of the -ton trucks were reconnaissance and the support of infantry with machine guns. These roles led to the desire to mount automatic rifles, to be fired from the jeep. To mount either a .30-caliber M1919 Browning machine gun or .50-cal (12.7 mm) M2 Browning heavy machine gun, the M31 pedestal, a tubular pedestal with bracing in three directions, was developed. This was the most common factory jeep machine-gun mount during the war, with 31,653 produced. It was followed by the improved M31C in March 1945, but this came too late for much combat in World WarII. Besides these, units often created their own pedestal mounts in the field or adapted other pedestal mounts as available. Additionally, in 1943 the M48 bracket mount was standardized, to attach the .30-cal. machine gun or .30-cal. M1918 Browning Automatic Rifle in front of the passenger seat. Like with the pedestals, troops improvised many gun-holding brackets in the field. Troops frequently preferred a .30 cal machine gun on a pivot, to fire from the front passenger seat.

Aside from actual fielding intentions, the jeep was widely used for various weapons mounts trials during World WarII, simply because the jeep was a handy platform to test all kinds of ring mounts, multiple gun mounts, as well as different weapons. The widespread adoption of the jeep in other armies also meant many different armaments. The most rigorous efforts were by the British. Perhaps the most well-known are the jeeps modified by the SAS for the 1942 desert raids in Egypt. These had several armaments, commonly using twin 0.303-inch Vickers K machine guns on the passenger side. These also served as a pattern for the later British airborne jeeps, armed with single Vickers K guns.

Field kits

Many field kits originated as locally made modifications and additions, for which standard kits were later produced by both the U.S. and Britain. Frequently used examples were rear baggage racks, ambulance litters and frames to transport lying wounded on jeeps, and wire cutters. Soldiers frequently ran into (literally) wires — either inadvertently, inconveniently strung communication wires, or deliberately placed by the enemy, to injure or kill motorcycle and vehicle personnel. The typical countermeasure was to mount a tall vertical steel bar to the front bumper, that would either cut offending strings or deflect them over the heads of the jeep crew. This was first used in Tunisia, 1943, but became frequent in Italy (1943–1945), and especially necessary in France (1944). 

More specific kits were created to enhance off-roading and mechanical capabilities, dealing with extreme climates, and technical support applications, like laying communication cables, or a field arc welder kit.

Many solutions made the jeep run on rails, popular in the Pacific theater with U.S., Britain, and Commonwealth troops, especially in Burma. A-frames on the front bumper enabled two jeeps to tow heavy trailers (for 2ton trucks) in tandem. For dessert cooling, radiator surge tanks were used in North Africa in 1942. Equally, there were winterization kits, even snowplows, and the jeep's go-anywhere capability was further aided with deep water fording kits, tire air compressors, and a winch option. For communications, jeeps were modified with rear ditch plows and cable laying reels, such as the RL-31-reel unit.

Off-road enhancements
To disembark jeeps in amphibious landings, in 1943 a deep-water fording kit for the jeep was produced. This enabled jeeps to be driven off landing craft like the Landing Craft Mechanized (LCM), wading into relatively deep water, without flooding the engine or short-circuiting the electrical system. After several interim kits were issued, the U.S. Army standardized the universal WV-6 kit (later G9-5700769) which served all World War II ton to 2ton trucks. The kit contained flexible hoses for both the exhaust and the air intake, as well as proper waterproofing equipment. Westinghouse developed a T1 air compressor, to be used in conjunction with special tires, to deflate the tires off-road, in soft mud or snow, and be able to pressurize them again after. It could be fitted under a maintenance work order, from October 1944. There was even a small capstan winch field kit made for the jeep, driven off the motor, for self-extracting, or pulling other jeeps trapped in mud or snow. The winch was very small and made the hand-cranking of the jeep impossible. The latter two features remained rare.

Arctic weather measures
Willys developed a winterization kit for very cold climates. This included a cold-starting stove, crankcase ventilator, primer, hood insulation blanket, radiator blanket, a body enclosure kit, defroster/deicer, and snow chains. These kits were however frequently unavailable, so units took their own measures in the field, particularly improvising various body enclosures, to protect the crew from extreme weather. In addition, two companies fabricated snowplows for the jeep. Geldhill Road Machinery Company made the 7T1NE plow, an angled single blade, while the JV5.5E was a V-shape design. The Wausau Iron Works built two similar designs, designated as the J and JB snowplows. Neither of these seem to have been commonly issued in combat. Photos of snowplows in use in the European theater mostly show improvised plows, likely adaptations of snowplows locally found at hand.

Further development of the jeep

Although no other light jeeps were taken into production, it was not for lack of trying. Both key military men, who had been championing the development of military vehicle concepts they had formulated for years – sometimes already since World War One – had led to conclusions about the logic of military mechanization, as well as automakers large and small, who now saw that in wartime, all of a sudden there were budgets available to work with. Of course, this was primarily true for the firms involved so far.

After losing out on mass production of the four-wheel drive -ton, Bantam built the Army one 4x2 quarterton chassis in 1942, but to no further consequence. 

An exception was an order for a series of some 200 to 500 standardized jeeps to be modified, by Holden (then G.M. of Australia), into field ambulances for the U.S. Marine Corps in the Pacific Theater, because they found the standard ton Dodge WC-54 ambulances too unwieldy, and even their own ton, 4x4 International M-1-4 vehicles both too ponderous and too scarce. In 1942, Lt. Cmdr. French Moore, MC, a battalion surgeon with the 2nd Marine Division (Camp Elliott, CA) started developing his design for an MB/GPW-based 'light field-ambulance'. He submitted blueprints, and records of the performance of his prototype to Marine Corps Commandant Lt. Gen. Thomas Holcomb. It could carry up to "35 patients 1,000 yards and return, in an hour." Rebuilt to Moore's design, it was approved for fielding in time for the Solomon Island Campaign in 1943. Three series were built in modest numbers but totaling more than the USMC's own ambulance versions of their International M-1-4 and M-2-4s.

Lightweight jeeps

After the initial design specification of a maximum  weight had been raised to almost double that in production, to achieve the necessary ruggedness on the main ton, the Army still wanted a truly lightweight model for airborne missions and use in the jungles of the Pacific theaters. In 1942 and 1943, at least five companies proposed designs: Crosley, Chevrolet, Ford, Willys, and Kaiser. The Crosley CT-3 "Pup" prototypes were superlight, one- or two-passenger, but still four-wheel-drive buggies, that were transportable and air-droppable from a Douglas C-47 Skytrain. Six of the 2-cylinder, 13 hp,  Pups were deployed overseas after undergoing tests at Fort Benning, Georgia, but the project was discontinued due to several weak components. Seven of 36 Pups built are known to 

Most of the competitors' models were more similar to standard jeeps, just lighter and smaller. Kaiser created six  prototypes with a 42 hp engine but including some unfavorable design trade-offs.

Willys eventually produced even more radical designs. The Willys WAC (Willys Air Cooled) had three seats, built around a centrally mounted 24 hp Harley Davidson engine, weighed only , but was noisy and not user-friendly. Still, it showed promise, and was further developed, eventually resulting in the Willys JBC, or 'Jungle Burden Carrier'. By early 1945 this had turned into a mere  motorized wheeled load-carrying platform, with a single seat, that preceded the 1950s Willys M274 'Mechanical Mule'.

In Britain, Nuffield Mechanizations and Aero cut down a Willys MB in length and width, and stripped it for minimum weight, to serve airborne forces. The Airborne Forces Development Centre in Wiltshire oversaw an entire modification program for jeeps in airborne units, involving many modifications to reduce both weight and or size, including to wedge them into Horsa gliders, for operation Market Garden.

Antitank jeeps
Besides towing 37mm antitank guns, it was also tested mounted directly on the quartertons. In early 1941, the US Army's Tank Destroyer Command was urgently looking to make their antitank guns more mobile, to better serve their tactical doctrine. One of the first prototypes, the T2 37mm Gun Motor Carriage (GMC), mounted a standard 37mm gun and gun shield on a Bantam BRC-40, aiming forward over the hood. Seven of these were built and tested, starting in May 1941, but were found awkward. So instead, eleven T2E1 GMC units aimed the 37mm gun rearwards for trials. Shooting rearwards had advantages, but this configuration also proved difficult to man and operate the gun. The units were all dismantled to regular jeeps. In 1942, the larger ton Dodge WC-52 was converted and standardized as the M6 Gun Motor Carriage, with a rear-aiming 37mm M3 gun, but these also worked poorly in the field, and most were rebuilt back to regular WC-52 trucks. Further designs were tried with stretched 6-wheel jeeps, but by 1943, the 37mm guns had become largely ineffective against German tanks.
Late in the war, in 1945, the first large-caliber recoilless rifles became available, and the first jeep-mounted tests were performed, but they only came to fruition after World WarII. One rare exception was Operation Varsity, for which two 75-mm. recoilless rifles were issued to the 17th U.S. Airborne Division, that could be mounted on their jeeps, proving useful in anti-tank fights.

Rocket jeeps

The jeep being too light to mount substantial guns, it was more suited later in the war, as a platform for rocket artillery, that did not have the enormous recoil as conventional tube artillery. The California Institute of Technology developed two different 4.5-inch jeep-based rocket launcher systems for the U.S. Navy. Several other initiatives all used 4.5-inch rockets and tubes. Testing was also done by both U.S. Army and Marine Corps, but none of the jeep-mounted rocket launchers were built in any significant number because it was more efficient to use larger trucks that could carry more rockets. The Soviet Red Army deployed twelve units fitted with 12-rail M-8 82mm rocket launchers in the bed of a jeep, from December 1944 in the Carpathian Mountains.

Stretched and uprated jeeps

To extend the jeep's luggage space, the simplest, and most frequently used method was the addition of a rear baggage rack. In exceptional cases, units would actually stretch both body and frame of a jeep, to give it more passenger and luggage space, but for this usage, a Dodge WC model was available in many cases. Nevertheless, building stretched, 6x6 jeeps with ton cross-country payload, was explored with much interest. As early as July 1941, after the unsuccessful testing with the T2 and T2E1 37mm antitank guns mounted on Bantam jeeps, the U.S. Quartermaster Corps (QMC) thought to lengthen ton jeeps into 6WD for specialized roles, including the 37mm gun. Willys was contracted that month for both a T13 and a T14 Gun Motor Carriage, based on the Willys MA – one firing forward, and one rearward, like the earlier Bantams. In reality, two models of rearward firing T14 were built, based on Willys MBs, one slat grille in late 1941, and one or more stamped grilles, by January 1942. Although the Willys T14 was actually found to be the best of several 37mm tank destroyers tested by the U.S. Army, by that time the M6 Gun Motor Carriage (based on the|Dodge ton) had been standardized for the Tank destroyer battalions.

Nevertheless, the QMC and Willys kept developing the ton 6x6, in various versions, as the "Super-Jeep". By March 1942, the T14 GMC was revised as a cargo / prime mover, named Willys 'MT-TUG', that could compete in some roles with the ton Dodges. The Army tested these in various configurations, up to a 1-ton rated version, as a light, multi-purpose tractor truck, cargo, or personnel carrier. For the United States Army Air Force (USAAF), several MT-Tug units were built with a fifth-wheel coupling on the cargo floor, for various Fruehauf trailers, and loaded with sandbags on the cargo bed, even as aircraft tugs. The Marine Corps also wanted a beefier truck, using standard jeep components, with a higher fixed side body structure, as a personnel or mortar squad carrier, or an 'MT-CA' field ambulance.

Willys pointed out that every 6x6 'Super Jeep' would save  of steel for their construction, as well as 40% in fuel usage, compared to the Dodge trucks. Moreover, it comprised 65% unaltered standard jeep components, and many of the other parts were also just modified standard jeep parts. By January 1943, the Willys MT-TUG was further evaluated by the Army Transport Command at Camp Gordon Johnston, FL. It was positively reviewed there for its effortless operation in deep sand. Although the Willys ton's performance was even called 'exemplary' by some, the U.S. Army nevertheless abandoned the Willys MT in favor of the already produced ton and 1ton trucks, because the Willys was 'surplus to requirements'.

Fifteen 6x6 Willys MT(-Tug)s alone were built as "Truck, -ton, 6×6, Tractor", under Ordnance production contract W303ORD4623, production order T6620, and even a maintenance supplement for the "6x6 Willys MBTug" was printed with the 1943 TM101513 technical manual. Including miscellaneous test units, a total of 24 units are believed to have been built, with six known survivors.

An even smaller number of ton jeeps with a slightly stretched wheelbase were built as the Willys MLW(−1) through MLW-4 "Jungle Jeep". LW stood for Long(er) Wheelbase, to accommodate significantly larger wheels and 7.50–20 tires with a tractor-like profile, with the objective to serve in the jungles of the Pacific theater, after a September 1943 request from the South West Pacific for a truck with payload and mobility over mud and swamps of jungle terrain, superior to that of the regular jeep.

Tracked jeeps

Several tracked jeep prototypes were built, because of such a need in Alaska and Canada. After America entered the war, a Japanese attack on the Aleutians suddenly made the Alaskan military base a zone of great military importance. The snow-rich circumstances created a need for tracked, jeep-like, all-purpose vehicles, and the Canadian Bombardier company and Willys created the T29 jeep half-track out of one of the existing 6x6 Willys MT chassis. The T-29 'Snow Tractor' (Jan 1943) expanded the rear chassis to a total of six wheels: three on each side, with a broad rubber belt serving as a track, running around two Ford model A wheels, followed by a notably larger wheel at each back corner. Instead of front wheels, the rig got skis, and the front-wheel driveline was omitted, to save cost and weight. It was followed up with the T29E1, on which front wheels returned, but mounted on the front skis, and still non-driven, just so that the front could now both glide and roll.
Due to Willys' workload, International Harvester helped assemble a further five T29E1 prototypes. Under the steering front wheels, skis could be mounted or removed. An Aberdeen test report critiqued that the T-29E1 was difficult to steer, as the tracks could not be controlled independently, and that prolonged use caused excessive track component wear. A completely rearranged rear was then proposed, and a T28 litter-carrier was completed for testing by August 1944. The only known surviving half-track World War II jeep is a WillysT28 named 'Penguin'. Further (fully) tracked "jeeps" were also armored, and developed for, and by Canada — see armored jeeps.

Armored jeeps
Many jeeps received added armor in the field, especially in Europe in 1944–1945. Frequently, a rear slanting armor plate was added in front of the grille, and replacing the windshield, as well as the sides, in place of where doors would be. The upper, biggest part was typically made of a single, large, 5/16th inch steel plate, folded in three, with two different sight openings in the front.

Since reconnaissance was one of the jeep's primary purposes, there was a demand for some armor from the start of production. Starting in April 1942, the second T14 GMC 6x6 Willys MT-Tug chassis was converted to the T24 Scout Car. Though performing well in trials, the T24 was abandoned in the autumn in favor of the M8 & M20 Light Armored Car. Concurrently, the Ordnance Corps was pushed to work on a lightly armored reconnaissance design, based on the standard Willys 4x4 jeep. Different armor configurations were tested on the T25 through T25E3 prototypes respectively. For all 4x4 armored jeeps, the significant weight increase reduced their payload, and adversely affected their mobility.

Canada created a light, tracked, armored, and armed vehicle using Jeep automotive components. In late 1942, the Canadian Department of National Defence (DND)'s Directorate of Vehicles and Artillery (DVA) began work at No.1 Proving Ground in Ottawa on a small, tracked vehicle successively named: 'Bantam Armoured Tracked Vehicle', the 'Light Recce Tank', and finally: the 'Tracked Jeep', TJ.

The vehicle was intended for taking messages over contested ground, armored reconnaissance, and engaging unarmored enemy troops in airborne and combined operations. Willys and Marmon-Herrington were contracted for five more prototypes, Willys for power train components, and MH for the armored hulls and the Hotchkiss-type running gear. The Tracked Jeep showed excellent cross-country performance and uphill mobility was better than other light-tracked utility vehicles, while its amphibious capability was adequate, despite its low freeboard. There were however serious shortcomings with the running-gear and tracks. Work to fix this delayed testing until late 1944, and British insights demanded such fundamental changes, that a Mk.2 version was developed, of which another six units were fabricated, and not ready until after the war had ended. The problems with tracks and running gear were still not sorted out, and development halted. America had observed the Canadian effort, but saw no advantages, compared to the M29'Weasel' Tracked Cargo Carrier.

Flying jeep

The most extreme concept tried was to turn the jeep into a rotor kite (or gyrokite), similar to an autogyro – the Hafner Rotabuggy (officially Malcolm Rotaplane). Designed by Raoul Hafner in 1942 and sponsored by the Airborne Forces Experimental Establishment (AFEE), after their Rotachute enjoyed some success, a passive rotor assembly was added over the jeep cabin, along with a lightweight tail, for stabilization. This jeep could be towed into the air by a transport or bomber tug. The Rotabuggy would then be towed to the drop zone as a rotary-wing glider. It took until autumn 1944 to achieve a decent test flight, and other military gliders, particularly the Waco Hadrian and Airspeed Horsa) made the Rotabuggy superfluous. Incidentally, it was first named the "Blitz Buggy", but that was soon dropped for "Rotabuggy".

Etymology

There is no consensus among historians as to how the U.S. Army's World War II quarter-ton reconnaissance car became known as the "jeep", let alone how the word originated in the first place. Explanations have proven difficult to verify. With certainty, the term "jeep" was already in use before the war, designating various things, while the -ton jeeps at first had many different designations and nicknames.

Eugene the Jeep and prior usage of "jeep"
According to several knowledgeable authors, the word "jeep" was used well before World War II; career soldiers used it since World War I – both as casual U.S. Army slang for new, uninitiated recruits or other personnel who still had to prove their mettle, as well as used by Army motor pool mechanics, about any new, unproven vehicles or prototypes. Zaloga also describes use as an adjective: "jeepy," similar to 'cooky' or 'goofy,' to mean anything insignificant, silly, awkward or foolish.

Later, in mid-March 1936, a character called Eugene the Jeep was created in E. C. Segar's Popeye cartoons. Eugene the Jeep was Popeye's "jungle pet" and was small, able to walk through walls and move between dimensions, and could go anywhere and solve seemingly impossible problems. The Eugene cartoon character brought new meaning to the Jeep name, diverging from the initial, somewhat pejorative meaning of the term, instead changing the slang to mean a capable person or thing. King Features Syndicate, publisher of the 'Thimble Theater' comics that featured Popeye and Eugene the Jeep, trademarked the name "Jeep" in August 1936.

Eugene the Jeep's go-anywhere ability resulted in various industrial and four-wheel drive vehicles getting nicknamed "Jeep" in the late-1930s. Around 1940, converted 4WD Minneapolis-Moline tractors, supplied to the U.S. Army as prime movers, were called "jeeps", and Halliburton used the name for an electric logging device, or for a custom built four-wheel drive exploration/survey vehicle. A small, anti-submarine, escort aircraft carrier was called a "jeep carrier" in the U.S. Navy in World War II, and also, several aircraft – prototypes for both Kellett autogiros, and for the Boeing B-17 Flying Fortress, as well as the 1941 Curtiss-Wright AT-9 were called "jeeps". Additionally, in 1936/1937, Canadian soldiers had received a ton Marmon-Herrington half-track and called it a "Jeep" (with a capital'J').

In 1940 through 1942, soldiers initially used "jeep" for half-ton or three-quarter-ton Dodge Command Reconnaissance cars, with the three-quarter-ton Command Cars later called "beeps" (for "big Jeeps"), while the quarter-ton cars were called "peeps", "son of jeep", "baby jeep", "puddle-jumper", "bug"; or "bantams" or "quads". A seven-page article in Popular Science (Oct 1941) headlined introducing the quarter-ton as "Leaping Lena" – also one of the nicknames of the ubiquitous, same length Ford Model T – and further called it a buggy, or just a bug. Originally, "peep" seemed a fitting name, because the quarter ton was considered primarily a reconnaissance (peeping) car.

The early 1940s terminology situation is summed up in the definition given in Words of the Fighting Forces by Clinton A. Sanders, a dictionary of military slang published in 1942, in the Pentagon library: "Jeep: A four-wheel drive car of one-half to one-and-one-half-ton capacity for reconnaissance or other army duty. A term applied to the bantam cars, and occasionally to other motor vehicles (U.S.A.) in the Air Corps, the Link Trainer; in the armored forces, the  ton command car. Also referred to as 'any small plane, helicopter, or gadget'." "Jeep" could still mean various things, including light-wheeled utility vehicles other than the jeep. Moreover, in April 1942, the Sarasota Herald-Tribune reported the Army was still "hopelessly divided" on how to define "jeep" or "peep". Despite opening with the definition of the lexicographer Dr. Charles E. Funk of the United Service Organizations (U.S.O.), identical to the above ("jeep: a four-wheel drive car of one-half to one-and-one-half-ton capacity for reconnaissance or other army duty"), a survey of Army camp editors in thirty states, conducted by the NCCS branch of the U.S.O. revealed that less than 25% agreed with that meaning for posterity. Twenty-six percent of camp editors still called the small combat rigs "Bantam cars", and 28% used names or definitions not even listed in the questionnaire. Ten percent considered that "jeeps are not peeps", whereas 6.6% contradicted that they are. "In May of 1942, newspapers announced the armored division [still] officially named the quarter-ton command/reconnaissance car the 'Peep', while the half-ton armored [division] car was called the 'Jeep'." The Milwaukee Journal published two photos to help readers distinguish between the two. In May 1942, an article in the Pittsburgh Press confirmed that the Army had legitimized the slang terms "jeep" and "peep" as words used by the Army, in official orders.

Relation with presence of light 4WDs in numbers
In the first years of the war, this usage of the term 'jeep' logically meshes with the ratios of U.S. light-wheeled military truck production. In 1940, the U.S. government took delivery of 8,058 light trucks – 6,583 of which were tons, 4x4, Dodge G-505 VC- and WC-models (82%). The ton jeep was yet to be designed. The half-tons provoked two insights: the military wanted many more, but also needed another vehicle – even smaller, lighter, and more agile. In 1941, Dodge ramped up the ton WC-series, delivering some 60,000 units, compared to some 15,000-quarter tons, almost all still early production units, built by three different manufacturers. Even in 1942, when production of the standardized ton jeep really got up to speed, it did not catch up to the WC-series' numbers — the 170,000 jeeps built still only amounted to half of the total 356,000 light trucks the Army had received by end of that year. It took until early 1943 for the Ford and Willys jeeps to outnumber the ton and ton Dodge WC models in service.

Origin of "jeep"
One of the most frequently given explanations is that the designation "GP" was slurred into the word "Jeep", in the same way that the HMMWV (for "High-Mobility Multi-purpose Wheeled Vehicle") has become known as the "Humvee" — either from the initial Ford model "GP" – or from the military "G.P.", for "General Purpose" (vehicle). Although the prior existence of the term "jeep" dismisses this as an etymology in the strict sense, it may well have contributed to the marriage of the term with the World War II quarter-ton vehicle.

The first version, based on the Ford "GP" model code, was already given in an article in the San Francisco Call-Bulletin in late 1941, and is to an extent plausible because the pre-standardized Ford GP was the first of the -ton jeeps to reach GIs by the hundreds, starting from early 1941. So it is possible "GP" could have evolved into "Geep" and then "jeep".

The latter 'GP'-based explanation though this does appear in the TM9-803 Manual, and the car is designated a "GP" in the TM9-2800 Manual — these were published in late 1943 and early 1944, and their influence on the jeep's name is dubious. One reason being: the jeep was not the only of the Quartermaster Corps' "general purpose" vehicles – so if this was the source, people would have nicknamed others "geeps" or "jeeps" as well, as they did before. More influential perhaps, was the 1943 short propaganda/documentary film The Autobiography of a 'Jeep', by the U.S. Office of War Information, in which the jeep itself literally propagates this origin story of its nickname.

Willys-Overland's positions and promotion
Joe Frazer, president of Willys-Overland from 1939 until 1944, claimed to have coined the word jeep by slurring the initials G.P., possibly related to Willys-Overland's 1943 trademark and 1946 copyright claims to the Jeep name. However, the company handling Willys' public relations in 1944 wrote that the jeep name probably came from the fact that the vehicle made quite an impression on soldiers at the time, so much so that they informally named it after the go-anywhere Eugene the Jeep.

In early 1941, when the test cars went by names like BRC / "Blitz-Buggy", Ford Pygmy, and others, Willys-Overland staged a press event in Washington, D.C., a publicity stunt and Senate photo opportunity demonstrating the car's off-road capability by driving it up and down the U.S. Capitol steps. Irving "Red" Hausmann, a test driver on the Willys development team who had accompanied the car for its testing at Camp Holabird, had heard soldiers there referring to it as a jeep. He was enlisted to go to the event and give a demonstration ride to a group of dignitaries, including Katherine Hillyer, a reporter for the Washington Daily News. When asked what it was, Hausmann said "it's a Jeep". Hausmann preferred "Jeep", to distinguish the Willys rig from the other funny-named quarter tons at Camp Holabird. Hillyer's syndicated article appeared in the newspaper on 20 February 1941, with a photo showing a jeep going up the Capitol steps and a caption including the term "jeep". This is believed to be the most likely origin of the term being fixed in public awareness. Even though Hausmann did not create or invent the word "Jeep", he likely contributed to its mainstream media usage indicating the quarter-ton vehicle.

Convergence from mixed origins and media coverage
It is plausible that the origin was mixed and converged on "jeep" from multiple directions. Ford Motor Company pushed its Ford GP hard, to get the military contract, putting the term "GP" into use. Military officers and G.I.s involved in the procurement and testing of the car may have called it jeep from the WWI slang. Civilian contractors, engineers, and testers may have related it to Popeye's "Eugene the Jeep" character. People may have heard the same name from different directions, and as one person heard it from another, put their own understanding and explanation on it. Overwhelming presence of the nickname 'jeep' in the public's opinion was probably the deciding factor.

From 1941 on, a "constant flow of press and film publicity", as well as Willys advertising as of 1942, proclaiming it had created and perfected the jeep, cemented the name "Jeep" in the civilian public's mind, even when "peep" was still used at many army camps, and President Roosevelt spoke of the vital role the "peep" had to play in defending the shores of Fort Story, Virginia (04-1942).

One other particularly influential article may have been the January 1942 full review of the military's new wonder buggy in Scientific American, reprinted as "Meet the Jeep" in Reader's Digest, the best-selling consumer magazine of the day. Author Jo Chamberlin was duly impressed by the "midget combat car" and wrote:

In a prescient footnote, Chamberlin wrote: "Some army men call the bantam a "peep", reserving "jeep" for the larger command car in which the brass hats ride. However, the term 'jeep' (born of GP, an auto manufacturing classification) is used by newspapers and most soldiers, and apparently will stick'".

Grille
Willys made its first 25,000 MB Jeeps with a welded flat iron "slat" radiator grille. It was Ford who first designed and implemented the now familiar and distinctive stamped, vertical-slot steel grille into its vehicles, which was lighter, used fewer resources, and was less costly to produce. Along with many other design features innovated by Ford, this was incorporated into the design and implemented by April 1942.

In order to be able to get their grille design trademarked, Willys gave their post-war jeeps a seven-slot grille instead of the Ford nine-slot design. This applies both to Willys' "Civilian Jeeps", as well as the M38 and M38A1 military models. Through a series of corporate takeovers and mergers, AM General Corporation ended up with the rights to use the seven-slot grille as well, which they in turn extended to Chrysler when it acquired American Motors Corporation, then the manufacturer of Jeep, in 1987.

Service

The USA provided jeeps to almost all of the Allies in World War II. Britain, Canada, Australia, India, the Free French, USSR, and China all received jeeps, mostly under the American Lend-Lease program. Some 182,500 units were provided to Allies under Lend-Lease alone. Almost 105,000 to the British Empire, including Australia and India, plus over 8,000 to Canada, and some 50,000 to the Soviet Union. The Free French (almost 10,000) and China (almost 7,000) were medium takers, and many other countries received a small number. America shipped a total of 77,972 various "jeeps" to the Soviet Union – consisting of 49,250 tons, 25,200 Dodge tons, and 3,520 Ford GPA.

In the deserts of the North African campaign, the jeep's abilities so far surpassed those of British vehicles that it was not unusual for jeeps to rescue a three-ton truck stuck in the sand. In combat, the British would use their jeeps in groups of up to fifty or sixty to raid Rommel's supply lines by surprise, exploiting the jeep's low silhouette; able to remain unseen, hide behind dunes, and surprise the enemy. 

Within the U.S. military, jeeps were used by every branch. In the U.S. Army, an average of 145 units were assigned to each infantry regiment. Around the world, jeeps served in every overseas theater of operation, in every environment, under all weather and climatic conditions — in North Africa and the Pacific Theater, the Western Allied invasion of Europe in 1944, as well as the Eastern Front. From deserts to mountains, from jungles to beachheads, jeeps could be pulled out of thick mud by their riders, and they were even flown into battle on light glider planes. In the European theater, they were so ubiquitous that some German troops believed that each American soldier was issued their own jeep.

Jeeps served as indefatigable pack horses for troop transport and towing supply trailers, carrying water, fuel, and ammunition, and pulling through the most difficult terrain. They performed nimble scout and reconnaissance duty, were frequent ambulances for the wounded, and did hearse service. They also doubled as mobile field command headquarters or weapons platforms – either with mounted machine guns or pulling small artillery pieces into "unreachable" areas over inhospitable terrain. The Jeep's flat hood was used as a commander's map table, a chaplain's field altar, the G.I.s' poker table, or even for field surgery. In the cauldron of war, the jeeps served every purpose imaginable: as a power plant, light source, improvised stove for field rations, or a hot water source for shaving. Equipped with the proper tools, it would plow snow, or dig long furrows for laying heavy electrical cable along jungle airfields – laid by another jeep following it.

Battle-hardened warriors learned to weld a roof-top height vertical cutter-bar to the front of their jeeps, to cut any trip wires tied across roads or trails by the Germans, placed to snap the necks of unsuspecting jeepers. Fitted with flanged steel wheels, they could pull railroad cars. In Europe, "The service of this vehicle was excellent, considering all the abuse it was obliged to take from bad roads, high speeds, overloading, and lack of maintenance. It performed tasks that it was never intended to perform, from carrying ammunition to locations where other wheeled vehicles could not travel, to serving as a cross-country ambulance traversing roads and country considered practically impassible." Pulitzer Prize–winning war journalist Ernie Pyle wrote: "It does everything. It goes everywhere. It's as faithful as a dog, as strong as a mule and as agile as a goat. It constantly carries twice what it was designed for, and still keeps on going."

Despite some shortcomings, the jeep was generally well-liked, and seen as versatile, maneuverable, reliable, as well as almost indestructible. The seats were found uncomfortable, sometimes caused the so-called "Jeep riders' disease" and cramped in the rear, but many soldiers enjoyed driving the nimble jeep, appreciating its powerful engine; and with its lightweight, low-cut body sides, bucket seats, and manual floor-shifter, it was as close to a sportscar as most GIs had ever driven. Enzo Ferrari called the Jeep "America's only real sports car." Nazi generals admired the jeep more than any other U.S. materiel, and it was the vehicle the most liked to capture for general use.

Post-war

Willys-Overland filed to trademark the "Jeep" name in 1943. From 1945 onwards, Willys marketed its four-wheel drive vehicle to the public with its CJ (Civilian Jeep) versions, making these the worlds' first mass-produced 4WD civilian cars. Even before actual civilian purpose Jeeps had been created, the 3 January 1944 issue of Life magazine featured a story titled: 'U.S. Civilians Buy Their First Jeeps'. A mayor from Kansas had bought a Ford GP in Chicago in 1943, and it performed invaluable work on his 2,000-acre farm.

Already in 1942 industrial designer Brooks Stevens came up with an idea on how to make a civilian car called Victory Car on the jeep chassis. It never went into production, but Willys liked the idea and gave Brook Stevens notable design jobs, including the 1946 Willys Jeep Station Wagon, 1947 Willys Jeep Truck, and 1948 Willys-Overland Jeepster, as well as the 1963–1993 Jeep Wagoneer.

In 1948, the U.S. Federal Trade Commission agreed with American Bantam that the idea of creating the Jeep was originated and developed by American Bantam in collaboration with the U.S. Army as well as Ford and Spicer. The commission forbade Willys from claiming, directly or by implication, that it had created or designed the jeep, and allowed it only to claim that it contributed to the development of the vehicle. The trademark lawsuit initiated and won by Bantam was a hollow victory: American Bantam went bankrupt by 1950 and Willys was granted the "Jeep" trademark the same year.

The first CJs were essentially the same as the MB, except for such alterations as vacuum-powered windshield wipers, a tailgate (and therefore a side-mounted spare tire), and civilian lighting. Also, the civilian jeeps had amenities like naugahyde seats, chrome trim, and were available in a variety of colors. Mechanically, a heftier T-90 transmission replaced the Willys MB's T84 in order to appeal to the originally considered rural buyer demographic.

In Britain, Rover were also inspired to build their own, very jeep-like vehicle. Their first testing prototype was actually built on the chassis of a war-surplus jeep, on the Welsh farm of then-Rover chief engineer Maurice Wilks and by his older brother, managing director Spencer Wilks. Production of their "Land Rover" started after its presentation model was well received at the first post-war Amsterdam International Auto show or 'AutoRAI' in 1948.

Willys-Overland and its successors, Willys Motors and Kaiser Jeep continued to supply the U.S. military, as well as many allied nations with military jeeps through the late 1960s. In 1950, the first post-war military jeep, the M38 (or MC), was launched, based on the 1949 CJ3A. In 1953, it was quickly followed by the M38A1 (or MD), featuring an all-new "round-fendered" body in order to clear the also new, taller, Willys Hurricane engine. This jeep was later developed into the civilian  launched in 1955. Similarly, its ambulance version, the M170 (or MDA), featuring a 20-inch wheelbase stretch, was later turned into the civilian .

Before the CJ-5, Willys offered the public a cheaper alternative with the taller F-head, overhead-valve engine, in the form of the 1953 , simply using a  body with a taller hood. This was quickly turned into the M606 jeep (mostly used for export, through 1968) by equipping it with the available heavy-duty options such as larger tires and springs, and by adding black-out lighting, olive drab paint, and a trailer hitch.

Though still a direct evolution of the round-fendered CJ5, it had a  longer wheelbase. And, for the first time, a CJ had doors, as well as an available hardtop. Since then, new evolutions were derived from the  – from 1987 onwards as Jeep "Wranglers". Nevertheless, these are considered direct descendants of the World War II jeep. The 2018 Wranglers still have a separate, open-topped body and ladder-frame, solid live axles front and rear, part-time four-wheel drive, and high and low gearing. The compact body retains the Jeep grille and profile, and can even still be driven with the doors off and the windshield folded forward.

Some firms, like Mahindra and Mahindra Limited in India, continue to produce them in some form or another to this day. Chinkara Motors of India produces the Jeepster, with FRP body. The Jeepster can be delivered a diesel engine or the 1.8L Isuzu petrol.

In France, the army used Hotchkiss M201 jeeps – essentially licensed Willys MBs, and in the former Yugoslavia, the arms manufacturer Zastava rebooted their car building branch, making 162 Willys jeeps. For instance, the Dutch built some 8,000 "NEKAF" jeeps, which remained in service for some 40 years. In Israel, AIL continues building military derivatives of Jeep Wrangler models for the Israeli Security Forces, ongoing since 1991. Their current AIL  models are based on Africa Automotive Distribution Services (AADS) of Gibraltar's Jeep J8 model.

The compact military jeep continued to be used in the Korean and Vietnam Wars. In Korea, it was mostly deployed in the form of the MB, as well as the M38 and M38A1 (introduced in 1952 and 1953), its direct descendants. In Vietnam, the most used jeep was the then newly designed Ford M151, which featured such state-of-the-art technologies as a unibody construction and all-around independent suspension with coil springs. The M151 jeep remained in U.S. military service into the 1990s, and many other countries still use small, jeep-like vehicles in their militaries.

Apart from the mainstream of — by today's standards — relatively small jeeps, an even smaller vehicle was developed for the U.S. Marine Corps, suitable for helicopter airlifting and manhandling, the M422 "Mighty Mite".

Eventually, the U.S. military decided on a fundamentally different concept, choosing a much larger vehicle that not only took over the role of the jeep, but also replaced all its other light-wheeled vehicles: the HMMWV ("Humvee").

In 1991, the Willys-Overland Jeep MB was designated an International Historic Mechanical Engineering Landmark by the American Society of Mechanical Engineers.

Postwar conversions

Filipino jeepney

When American troops began to leave the Philippines at the end of World War II, hundreds of surplus jeeps were sold or given to local Filipinos. The Filipinos stripped down the jeeps to accommodate several passengers, added metal roofs for shade, and decorated the vehicles with vibrant colors and bright chrome hood ornaments.

The jeepney rapidly emerged as a popular and creative way to re-establish inexpensive public transportation, which had been virtually destroyed during the war. Recognizing the widespread use of these vehicles, the Philippine government began to place restrictions on their use. Drivers now must have specialized licenses, regular routes, and reasonably fixed fares.

Argentine Autoar
Starting in 1950, a Jeep-engine utility vehicle was produced by Autoar in Argentina. Starting from 1951, a new sedan was introduced using the same 2199 cc Jeep engine and manual transmission. It was fitted with an overdrive unit to compensate for the Jeep's low axle ratio. In 1952, a new overhead valve 3-litre six-cylinder was announced but was probably never built. At that time, Piero Dusio returned to Italy. In the 1950s, production was sporadic, and models built included a station wagon with a Jeep-type 1901 cc engine.

Commemorative edition
Inspired by the Willys MB, Jeep produced about 1,000 Willys editions of the 2004 Wrangler TJ and hoped to sell twice that number for the 2005 model year.

Production numbers

Gallery

Operators

See also
 Jeep train
 Mitsubishi Type 73 Light Truck
 Willys FAMAE Corvo

Notes

References

General references

Further reading
 399 pages. – Documents the jeep from the conception of the (Bantam) Reconnaissance Car, to the Quarter Master Corps' awarding of the jeep contract to Willys.

External links

The history of Jeep – How Stuff Works — links further to several detailed chapters
Origin of the Military Jeep  – Historic timeline on Olive Drab
The U.S. Veterans Memorial Museum: Military jeeps

British Army Jeep Research – Non-profit resource on the jeep in British service
The Jeep – One of the Most Famous Vehicles in the World – is Celebrated at its Birthplace. - Voice of America

Jeep
World War II vehicles of the United States
Military trucks of the United States
Motor vehicles manufactured in the United States
Military light utility vehicles
GPW
MB
Military vehicles introduced from 1940 to 1944